José Faustino Sánchez Carrión (*Huamachuco, Trujillo, February 13, 1787 - Lurín, Lima, June 2, 1825), was a pro-independence politician from Peru. Also known as the "Solitario de Sayán" (English: "Solitary man from Sayán"), he had a decisive role in the establishment of the republican system of government in post-independence Peru. He was one of the writers of the first political constitution of Peru, of liberal tendencies. He later participated in the diplomatic mission which traveled to Guayaquil to invite Simon Bolivar to Peru. He died prematurely, victim of an unknown sickness.

Sánchez Carrión severed as Bolivar's secretary or general minister, accompanying him throughout his victorious campaign in Peruvian soil and acquiring the necessary resources needed by the United Liberating Army (composed by the Expedición Libertadora del Perú, Gran Colombia, and the Republic of Peru) which emerged victorious in the battles of Junin and Ayacucho. He was Minister of Finance of Peru from April 1824 to October 1824. Afterwards, he served from 1824 to 1825 as Peru's Minister of Government and Foreign Relations, and as such signed the invitations written by Simon Bolivar for the American nation's attendance to the Congress of Panama.

See also 
 Independence of Peru
 Congress of Panama

References 

Bibliografía
 Basadre, Jorge: Historia de la República del Perú. 1822 - 1933, Octava Edición, corregida y aumentada. Tomo 1. Editada por el Diario "La República" de Lima y la Universidad "Ricardo Palma". Impreso en Santiago de Chile, 1998.
Chirinos Soto, Enrique: Historia de la República (1821-1930). Tomo I. Desde San Martín hasta Augusto B. Leguía. Lima, AFA Editores Importadores S.A, 1985.
Tauro del Pino, Alberto: Enciclopedia Ilustrada del Perú. Tercera Edición. Tomo 15. SAL/SZY. Lima, PEISA, 2001. 
Varios autores: Grandes Forjadores del Perú. Lima, Lexus Editores, 2000.

External links 
 Educared
 Pensamiento

1787 births
1820 deaths
People from Trujillo, Peru
Peruvian politicians
Foreign ministers of Peru
Peruvian Ministers of Economy and Finance